All Night Long is the second studio album recorded (but the first put out) by Junior Kimbrough, released in 1992.

Track listing 
All songs composed by Junior Kimbrough, except "I Feel Alright", based on the song by Junior Parker
"Work Me Baby" – 4:44 
"Do the Romp" – 3:57  
"Stay All Night" – 4:44
"Meet Me in the City" – 6:50
"You Better Run" – 7:33
"Done Got Old" – 2:36   
"All Night Long" – 5:50
"I Feel Alright" – 4:02 
"Nobody but You" – 5:54
"Slow Lightnin'" – 3:22

Personnel
Junior Kimbrough - Vocals and Guitar
Garry Burnside - Bass
Kenny Malone - Drums

References

Junior Kimbrough albums
1992 albums
Fat Possum Records albums